Ichthyophonus is a genus of unicellular eukaryotic parasites of fish. They were once considered to be fungi, but phylogenetic evidence suggests they are protists related to both fungi and animals.

Species
 Ichthyophonus gasterophilus (Caullery & Mesnil 1905) Sprague 1965
 Ichthyophonus hoferi Plehn & Mulsow 1911
 Ichthyophonus intestinalis Léger & Hesse 1923
 Ichthyophonus irregularis Rand et al. 2000
 Ichthyophonus lotae Leger 1925

References

Mesomycetozoea
Parasitic opisthokonts
Parasites of fish
Eukaryote genera